Borg is a cluster manager used by Google. It led to widespread use of similar approaches such as Docker and Kubernetes.

See also 
 Apache Mesos
 List of cluster management software
 Kubernetes
 DC/OS
 Operating-system-level virtualization (containerization)

References

Further reading 
 A New Era of Container Cluster Management with Kubernetes

Cluster computing
Google software